Let's Love is an album by jazz singer Peggy Lee that was released in 1974. It was her first for Atlantic Records after many years with Capitol. The title track was written, arranged, produced by Paul McCartney.

This title song came about when Peggy Lee was in London performing at the Royal Albert Hall in 1974. She invited Paul McCartney and his wife Linda to dinner at The Dorchester. Mccartney brought a gift for Lee and it was a song he had written with his wife called "Let's Love". Arrangements were made for the song to be recorded in June 1974 at the Record Plant in Los Angeles with McCartney producing.

Track listing

CD reissue bonus tracks

Personnel
 Peggy Lee – vocals
 Chuck Findley – trumpet
 Frank Rosolino – trombone
 Vincent DeRosa – French horn
 Gene Cipriano – oboe
 Jerome Richardson – alto and soprano saxophones
 Pete Christlieb – tenor saxophone, flute
 Dennis Budimir – guitar
 Dan Ferguson – guitar
 Lee Ritenour – guitar
 David T. Walker – guitar
 Geoffrey Gaffney – keyboards
 Dave Grusin – keyboards
 Dick Borden – drums
 Harvey Mason – drums
 Chuck Rainey – bass guitar
 Bobbye Hall – congas

References

External links
 http://www.peggyleediscography.com/p/LeeAtlantic.php

1974 albums
Peggy Lee albums
Atlantic Records albums